Suad Kalesić (born 1954) is a Bosnian-Herzegovinian retired football defender who played in several clubs in Yugoslav First and Second League.

Playing career

Club
Born in Tuzla, SR Bosnia and Herzegovina back then within Yugoslavia, he started playing in local side FK Sloboda Tuzla playing in the Yugoslav First League between 1972 and 1976. In summer 1976 he moved to NK Osijek which were playing in the Yugoslav Second League but were aspiring promotion, which they archived at the end of the season. Kalesić then played the first half of the 1977–78 Yugoslav First League with Osijek, but at the winter break another top-league side brought him to their team, FK Radnički Niš. He played in Niš until summer 1979 when he moved to FK Budućnost Banovići playing with them until 1988 in third level.

Managerial career
He was replaced by Mirza Hadzić as manager of Sloboda Tuzla in March 2002.

References

External links
 

1954 births
Living people
Sportspeople from Tuzla
Association football defenders
Yugoslav footballers
FK Sloboda Tuzla players
NK Osijek players
FK Radnički Niš players
FK Budućnost Banovići players
Yugoslav First League players
Yugoslav Second League players
Bosnia and Herzegovina football managers
FK Sloboda Tuzla managers
Premier League of Bosnia and Herzegovina managers